Pinoke McIntyre (September 27, 1934 – May 2, 2019) was a Canadian ice hockey player with the Trail Smoke Eaters. He won a gold medal at the 1961 World Ice Hockey Championships in Switzerland. He also played with the Rossland Warriors.

References

1934 births
2019 deaths
Canadian ice hockey left wingers
Sportspeople from Trail, British Columbia
Ice hockey people from British Columbia